Bangil Station (BG) is a class I (one) railway station located in Pogar, Bangil, Pasuruan Regency; entered within eastern border of Operational Area VII Surabaya of Kereta Api Indonesia (KAI) at the height of ± 9 meters above sea level (railway line Surabaya-Bangil). To the east of this station, there are forks towards Pasuruan-Probolinggo-Jember-Banyuwangi and to Malang.

To the west of this station, before entering Porong there is Gununggangsir which is deactivated due to low income. Bangil is the main railway station in the west of Pasuruan Regency, so this is one of the most busiest station in East Java that most of the trains stop at here.

History 
Bangil railway station was commissioned by Staatsspoorwegen Eastern Exploitation as a state railway company in Dutch East Indies on May 16th, 1878 at the same time as the commissioning of Surabaya―Bangil―Pasuruan railway line which was among the first railway line construction. Bangil is classified as a huge station, it has a locomotive depot. After Staatsspoorwegen commissioned the Surabaya−Pasuruan line, the company continued to built a new line to Malang which was commissioned on July 20th, 1879. 

This station has the same facade and design as Kertosono that includes the main building, canopy and the emplacement. The main building of the station had been rebuilt, except for the platform canopy and a turntable also locomotive depot that both of them are not used today. In some records, the original main building was bombed and destroyed during 2nd Dutch Military Aggression against the Republic of Indonesia, (see Operation Kraai) in 1948. After the battle, the DKA-RI (the Department of Railways of the Republic of Indonesia) rebuilt the main building of the station at the following year.

To the south of the station, behind an abandoned locomotive depot there was a railway line connected to Pandaan and Japanan operated by a private railway company named Modjokerto Stoomtram Maatschappij (MdjSM) or Mojokerto Steam Tram Co. as for Bangil-Japanan-Mojokerto rail line which opened on May 4th, 1919. The line itself was used for the freight route and along this line, there were Pandaan (Ardiredjo) and Japanan sugar mills. In addition, this line was a displacement railway line for MdjSM from the old line (Bangil−Pandaan) which was inaugurated on September 18th, 1899. The first MdjSM line used this station from track no.1 to the east and then curved to the south, then around 1914 Staatsspoorwegen (SS) proposed a new line which used as a freight route service and this also impacted the operation of MdjSM's asset (railway line). The shift of MdjSM railway line to the south was because the line to Sumberredjo sugar mill was actually belonged to MdjSM as part of Pandaan-Bangil line based on Government's Decree No.1 on 31 of December 1895. After line to Pandaan finished and opened in 1899, the MdjSM didn't continue the construction to the north (Kaliredjo) which connected to the sugar mill and considered less profitable for their business operations and finally was taken over by State Railway Co. or Staatsspoorwegen to built it which started from track number one from this station connected to Sumberredjo sugar mill passing Bangil town square (just north from the station) around 1914-16 and finished in 1919. Then, the MdjSM moved their asset (railway) to the south and finally they also built their own station (Bangil MdjSM) not far from Bangil station in the south which now become a resident house, just behind Bangil locomotive depot. The sugar mill itself was defunct around 1932/1933 followed by Pandaan and Japanan as a result of Great Depression and Sumberredjo changed to a textile factory named "Kantjil Mas" in 1934 and owned by a German businessman. During Independence War (1947-1949), Bangil-Japanan railway line was damaged so it couldn't be used so after the war the DKA (Djawatan Kereta Api) Building Service was forced to renovate this rail line around 1949-1950 so that these lines could be operated again. Finally, this line was defuncted in 1969 as a result of a mismatched with the urban planning of Mojokerto at the time.

Services 
The following list of trains that are stopped at this station :

Passenger Train

Intercity

Commuter / Local

Freight Train 
Pertamina Tanker, to Benteng and Malang Kotalama

Gallery

References

External links
 

Railway stations in East Java
Railway stations opened in 1878